Bradley Whitford is an American actor and producer. He is known for his portrayal of White House Deputy Chief of Staff Josh Lyman in the NBC television political drama The West Wing (1999–2006), Danny Tripp in Studio 60 on the Sunset Strip (2006-2007), Marcy in Transparent (2014-2019), and The Handmaid's Tale (2018–present).

For his role in The West Wing he was nominated for three consecutive Primetime Emmy Awards from 2001 to 2003, winning in 2001. This role also earned him three consecutive Golden Globe Award nominations. In 2015, he won a second Primetime Emmy Award for his role as Marcy in Transparent and later garnered a fifth Primetime Emmy Award nomination for portraying Magnus Hirschfeld in the same series. Since 2018, Whitford has portrayed Commander Joseph Lawrence in Hulu dystopian drama The Handmaid's Tale, for which he won his third Primetime Emmy Award in 2019.

Major associations

Primetime Emmy Awards

Golden Globe Awards

Screen Actors Guild Awards

Miscellaneous awards

References 

Whitford, Bradley